Anisonyches is a genus of tardigrades in the family Echiniscoididae.  The genus was first described and named by Leland W. Pollock in 1975. The genus name is a combination of the Greek  aniso ("unequal") and onyches ("claws"), since Anisonyches have four claws each on the first three pairs of legs and three claws each on the fourth pair of legs.

Species
According to Degma, Bertolani et Guidetti (2018), this genus includes three species:
 Anisonyches deliquus Chang & Rho, 1998
 Anisonyches diakidius Pollock, 1975
 Anisonyches eleutherensis Bartels, Fontoura & Nelson, 2018
 Anisonyches mauritianus Grimaldi de Zio, D’Addabbo Gallo, Morone De Lucia & Daddabbo, 1987

References

Echiniscoididae
Tardigrade genera